Help (styled as HELP) is a six-part Australian documentary series is broadcast on SBS One that takes you inside the real-life events that Ambulance officers and paramedics face every day while on the job. Since 2010, the program is currently airing on Wednesday afternoons at 3pm.

Overview
Every minute of every day, someone calls an ambulance for help. This series provides a unique insight into a world only seen by ambulance officers, paramedics and emergency victims, as lipstick cameras mounted onto the hats of ambulance officers gives viewers unprecedented access into one of society's most gritty, demanding and challenging jobs – that of the NSW Ambulance Service's paramedics and officers.

The Paramedic's role is a vital one: they are often the first on an accident scene, providing critical treatment for sick or injured people, aiming to stabilise the patient during transportation to hospital. They are society's genuine, unsung heroes who quietly go about their business of saving lives, every day.

This fresh series brings a new perspective to the world of medically themed television, through its unprecedented fly-on-the-wall access as the crew accompanies members of the NSW Ambulance Service as they go about their life-saving work.

Help is an edge-of-your-seat ride into a whole other world that is only seen by ambulance officers, paramedics and emergency victims.

Episodes
The series was first transmitted in Australia from 12 July to 23 August 2006. A total of six episodes were filmed, no further episodes have been announced.

External links 
  (Archived by SBS)

Special Broadcasting Service original programming
Australian medical television series
Australian factual television series
Television shows set in Sydney
2006 Australian television series debuts
2006 Australian television series endings